Halifax East was a provincial electoral district in Nova Scotia, Canada, that elected one member to the Nova Scotia House of Assembly. It was formed in 1933 when Halifax County was divided into five distinct electoral districts. In 1966, it was renamed Halifax County East, and in 1967, its boundaries were reformed to create the current district of Halifax Eastern Shore.

Members of the Legislative Assembly 
Halifax East elected the following members to the Legislative Assembly:

Election results

1933 general election

1937 general election

1941 general election

1945 general election

1949 general election

1953 general election

1956 general election

1960 general election

1963 general election

References

Former provincial electoral districts of Nova Scotia